This is the discography of Taiwanese Mandopop singer-songwriter, rapper and music producer,   Will Pan . His discography consists of twelve studio albums, one compilation album, one remix album, six video albums, twenty-two singles and ninety music videos.

Albums

Studio albums

Compilation albums

Remix albums

Singles

As lead artist

As featured artist

Collaborative singles

Charity singles

Promotional singles

Credited songs

Songs written and performed by Will Pan
This list contains songs written and/or produced by Pan, including those where he is credited as co-author.

Songs written by Will Pan for other artists
Pan has written/co-written songs that were later recorded and released by other artists.

Videography

Video albums

Music videos

References

External links

Discographies of Taiwanese artists
Mandopop discographies
Pop music discographies